Triazeugacanthus is an extinct genus of spiny shark from the Devonian of Canada. It contains a single species, Triazeugacanthus affinis. Individuals were 5-6 cm long. Each fin (besides the caudal fin) contained a stout spine.

References 

Acanthodii genera
Devonian fish of North America
Monotypic fish genera